Tadeusz Glimas (17 February 1925 – 13 May 1969) was a Polish footballer. He played in four matches for the Poland national football team from 1950 to 1952. He was also part of Poland's squad for the football tournament at the 1952 Summer Olympics, but he did not play in any matches.

References

1925 births
1969 deaths
Polish footballers
Poland international footballers
Association football defenders
MKS Cracovia (football) players